El Orcoquisac Archeological District is a registered U.S. historic site located near Galveston Bay in present-day Wallisville, Texas. The site preserves an important Spanish presidio and trading center as well as an important settlement for the Akokisa and Bidai tribes that once inhabited the area.

Frenchmen, led by Joseph Blancpain and engaged in fur and hide trading with the tribes, had operated in the area near the mouth of the Trinity River in the early 18th century even though the area was claimed by the Spanish. Alarmed by this, the Spanish drove out the French and, in 1756, established a presidio known as San Augustín de Ahumada at the El Orcoquisac site. Within the presidio, a Roman Catholic mission known as Nuestra Señora de la Luz was also established. The Spanish post was never as successful in fur trading as Blancpain's operation. The presidio and mission were moved and gradually abandoned in the later 18th century.

The site was rediscovered by the amateur historian John V. Clay in 1965 and was added to the National Register of Historic Places in 1972.

See also
 History of the Galveston Bay Area

References

External links

Texas Beyond History — El Orcoquisac

Archaeological sites in Texas
Archaeological sites on the National Register of Historic Places in Texas
Native American history of Texas
Greater Houston
Geography of Chambers County, Texas
Historic districts on the National Register of Historic Places in Texas
National Register of Historic Places in Chambers County, Texas